Dallas Seymour (born 19 August 1967 in Tokoroa) is a former New Zealand rugby union footballer and rugby sevens player. One of New Zealand rugby sevens longest serving players he played in the national team from 1988 until 2002. He made a brief appearance as an All Black, playing 3 tour matches in Australia in 1992.

He is married to former Silver Fern captain Julie Seymour.

References

1967 births
Living people
New Zealand rugby union players
New Zealand international rugby union players
Commonwealth Games gold medallists for New Zealand
Rugby union players from Tokoroa
New Zealand international rugby sevens players
Commonwealth Games rugby sevens players of New Zealand
Commonwealth Games medallists in rugby sevens
Rugby sevens players at the 1998 Commonwealth Games
New Zealand male rugby sevens players
Medallists at the 1998 Commonwealth Games